The 1990 Supercopa Sudamericana was the third season of the Supercopa Sudamericana, a club football tournament for past Copa Libertadores winners. The tournament was won by Olimpia, who beat Nacional 6–3 on aggregate in the final.

Despite being a former Copa Libertadores winner, Colombian side Atlético Nacional were forced to withdraw after CONMEBOL had prohibited international matches in Colombia in 1990 following allegations that a referee was threatened by six gunmen on the occasion of a match between Atlético Nacional and Vasco da Gama during the 1990 Copa Libertadores quarter-finals.

First round
The matches were played from 18 October to 8 November. Teams from the same nation could not be drawn against one another. Boca Juniors, as the title holders, entered the competition at the quarter-finals.

|}

Quarter-finals
The matches were played from 14 to 21 November.

|-
| style="text-align: center;" colspan="3"| Estudiantes
| style="text-align: center;" colspan="2"|Bye
|}

Semi-finals
The matches were played from 28 November to 10 December.

|}

Final

|}

See also
1990 Copa Libertadores

External links
RSSSF
RSSSF (Full Details)

Supercopa Libertadores
2